Cassius Vinicius Coelho (born 15 June 1995), simply known as Cassius, is a Brazilian footballer who plays as a central defender for América-RJ.

Club career
Born in Campo Grande, Mato Grosso do Sul, Cassius started his career with São Paulo at the age of ten. He was subsequently released, and joined Portuguesa in 2011.

Cassius was promoted to Lusa's main squad in 2013 by manager Péricles Chamusca, aged only 17. However, he failed to make a single appearance during the year, as his side suffered relegation from Série A.

In 2014, Cassius suffered a severe knee injury which kept him sidelined for one year. After again being not used, he left the club and joined Santos, in a one-year loan deal on 14 January 2016.

Cassius left Santos in the end of the year, without playing a single minute for either the first team or the B-side. In May 2017 he joined URT, and made his senior debut on 21 May by coming on as a second-half substitute for Allan Dias in a 3–0 Série D away loss against Portuguesa-RJ.

On 15 December 2017, Cassius joined Grêmio Anápolis. The following 6 August, after being sparingly used, he moved abroad and joined Moldovan National Division side FC Zimbru Chișinău on a one-and-a-half-year contract.

On 5 March 2019, Cassius switched teams and countries again, signing for Amora FC in the Campeonato de Portugal. After a spell at Anapolina, Cassius joined Albanian club KF Vllaznia Shkodër on 26 August 2020. However, only two months later, he left the club and moved to FC Sfântul Gheorghe Suruceni in Moldova. He left Sfântul Gheorghe in early January 2021.

Career statistics

References

External links
Futebol de Goyaz profile 

1995 births
Living people
People from Campo Grande
Brazilian footballers
Association football defenders
Campeonato Brasileiro Série D players
Moldovan Super Liga players
Campeonato de Portugal (league) players
Associação Portuguesa de Desportos players
Santos FC players
União Recreativa dos Trabalhadores players
Grêmio Esportivo Anápolis players
Associação Atlética Anapolina players
FC Zimbru Chișinău players
F.C. Arouca players
KF Vllaznia Shkodër players
FC Sfîntul Gheorghe players
Brazilian expatriate footballers
Brazilian expatriate sportspeople in Moldova
Brazilian expatriate sportspeople in Portugal
Brazilian expatriate sportspeople in Albania
Expatriate footballers in Moldova
Expatriate footballers in Portugal
Expatriate footballers in Albania
Sportspeople from Mato Grosso do Sul